Mata Ayer is a small town in the middle part of Perlis, Malaysia. It located on the way from Arau to Padang Besar.

Towns in Perlis